Daryle Singletary is the debut studio album by the American country music singer of the same name. It was released in 1995 (see 1995 in country music) via Giant Records Nashville. The album includes four singles: "I'm Living Up to Her Low Expectations", "I Let Her Lie", "Too Much Fun" and "Workin' It Out", all of which charted on the Billboard country singles charts between 1995 and 1996. Although "I Let Her Lie" and "Too Much Fun" were both Top 5 country hits, the album only peaked at #44 on Top Country Albums.

Critical reception
Alanna Nash of Entertainment Weekly gave the album a B+ rating, saying that Singletary "mines familiar honky-tonk sources on this stylish debut, but he has a terrific presence and a knack for inhabiting a lyric."

The track "My Heart's Too Broke (To Pay Attention)" was previously recorded by Mark Chesnutt on his 1993 album Almost Goodbye.

Track listing

Personnel
As listed in liner notes.
Larry Byrom – acoustic guitar
Mark Casstevens – acoustic guitar
Paul Franklin – steel guitar
Sonny Garrish – steel guitar
Rob Hajacos – fiddle
Dann Huff – electric guitar
Paul Leim – drums
Brent Mason – electric guitar, acoustic guitar
Terry McMillan – harmonica
Jimmy Nichols – organ on "I Let Her Lie"
Hargus "Pig" Robbins – piano
Matt Rollings – piano
Daryle Singletary – lead vocals
Rhonda Vincent – background vocals on "Would These Arms Be in Your Way"
Glenn Worf – bass guitar
Curtis Wright – background vocals
Curtis Young – background vocals

Chart performance

References

1995 debut albums
Daryle Singletary albums
Giant Records (Warner) albums
Albums produced by James Stroud
Albums produced by David Malloy